Sperata acicularis is a species of bagrid catfish endemic to Myanmar where it is found in the Irrawaddy, Bago, and Great Tenasserim River systems of Myanmar.

References 
 

Bagridae
Fish of Myanmar
Endemic fauna of Myanmar
Freshwater fish of Asia
Taxa named by Carl J. Ferraris Jr.
Taxa named by Kathryn E. Runge 
Fish described in 1999